Donald Mario Stark (born July 5, 1954) is an American actor known for his role as Bob Pinciotti on the Fox Network sitcom That '70s Show for all eight seasons (19982006) and fictional Los Angeles Devils owner Oscar Kinkade in VH1's Hit the Floor, Star Trek: First Contact (1996), and John Carter (2012). He also provided the voice of Vincent in Father of the Pride (2004–2005) and voiced Rhino in Spider-Man: The Animated Series (1995-1997).

Early life

Stark was born in New York City. His father, Alan Stark (1924–2008), was an actor. Don's mother, Debra Antorelli (1926–1993), was a homemaker.

As a child, Stark and his family relocated to Los Angeles, California, settling in the San Fernando Valley. Stark graduated from Grover Cleveland High School in Reseda, California, in 1972. He played football for the school team, and he won leading roles in the theater arts department. He portrayed John in Dark of the Moon, Sky Masterson in Guys and Dolls, Tevye in Fiddler on the Roof, and, in an award-winning Shakespeare Festival scene, the title role in Othello.

After high school, Stark attended California State University, Northridge, originally studying business before deciding to major in theater arts.

Career
Stark has an extensive background in dancing, bodybuilding and martial arts. Don is probably best recognized as Bob Pinciotti, the bumbling next-door neighbor of the Forman family and the father of Donna Pinciotti (Laura Prepon) on the FOX sitcom That '70s Show.

Don's roles in movies include Switchblade Sisters (1975), Tilt (1979), Evilspeak (1981), Peggy Sue Got Married (1986) and The Couch Trip (1988), as well as a small role as a clerk in the comedy film Feds (1988). He has also been a guest on Curb Your Enthusiasm, and had a small role in the Star Trek film Star Trek: First Contact. He had a small role in an episode of Supernatural as a victim of a ghost that had been summoned by ritual to murder. He also guest starred on Viper, Disney Channel's Cory in the House, Stargate SG-1 and CSI.

He had a supporting role in the 1996 television series Time Cop. In addition, he appeared in iCarly's movie: iGo to Japan as Freight Dog, the pilot who flies the gang over to Tokyo, Japan.

Stark appears in the first episode of the 1987 TV series Beauty and the Beast as one of the attackers who puts Linda Hamilton's character "Catherine" in Central Park where the beast, or "Vincent", played by Ron Perlman, finds her and helps her, which begins the series. He appeared as David in the film My Name is Jerry. He appeared as the Prime Minister of Russia in the episode of Cory in the House, "Air Force One Too Many". He plays the boss, Stan, in the web series Corey & Lucas For the Win. He also provided his voice for Rhino in few episodes of Spider-Man: The Animated Series.

One of his more recent appearances was as a mobster in the episode of Castle, "Murder He Wrote". He also had a small, uncredited role as a principal in Anger Management, "Charlie Lets Kate Take Charge". Stark plays the role of Oscar Kincade in the television series Hit the Floor. He played Uncle Frank in the 2015 film Hello, My Name Is Doris. He played Judge Talbertson in the 2017 Scorpion episode, "Who Let the Dog Out ('Cause Now It's Stuck In a Cistern')". Also in 2017, Stark played Bernie Greenfield, a drug-addicted Hollywood executive in There's...Johnny!.

Selected filmography

 1973 Outrage as Carl Dibble
 1975 Switchblade Sisters as Hook
 1979 Tilt as Gary Laswitz
 1981 Evilspeak as Bubba Caldwell
 1981 Choices as Lance
 1986 Peggy Sue Got Married as Doug Snell
 1988 The Couch Trip as Peterson
 1988 Under the Gun as Joey
 1988 Arthur 2: On the Rocks as Diner Customer
 1988 Feds as Willy
 1991 9 1/2 Ninjas! as 'Sledge'
 1991 Liquid Dreams as Escort to Penthouse
 1993 The Baby Doll Murders as Eric Green
 1993 Freaked as Editor
 1993 Lightning in a Bottle as Yard Messenger
 1994 Revenge of the Red Baron as Detective Lewis
 1994 Ring of Steel as Lieutenant Taylor
 1994 3 Ninjas Kick Back as Umpire
 1994 Maverick as Riverboat Poker Player (uncredited)
 1995-1997 Spider-Man as Rhino (voice)
 1995 Night of the Running Man as Rodney
 1995 3 Ninjas Knuckle Up as Sheriff
 1995 Things to Do in Denver When You're Dead as Gus
 1995 Bombmeister as Unknown
 1996 Heaven's Prisoners as Eddie Keats
 1996 Santa with Muscles as Lenny
 1996 Star Trek: First Contact as Nicky 'The Nose'
 1996 Earth Minus Zero as John 'J.W.' Wayne
 1998 Letters from a Killer as Geary
 1998 American Dragons as Rocco
 1998-2006 That '70s Show as Bob Pinciotti
 1999 California Myth as Marshall
 1999 Goosed as Dick
 2002 The 4th Tenor as Tony
 2004 Slammed as Uncle Mack
 2007 Supernatural as Jay Wiley.
 2009 Dark House as Detective Gorog
 2009 iCarly as Freight Dog
 2009 My Name Is Jerry as David
 2011 Meeting Spencer as 'Wolfie'
 2012 John Carter as Dix, The Storekeeper
 2012-2017 NCIS as Marty Fiero
 2013 Wrong Cops as Gary
 2013 Random Encounters as Dr. Tim
 2014 Roswell FM as Howard Bellringo
 2015 Hello, My Name Is Doris as Uncle Frank
 2015 Safelight as Jack
 2016 Monkey Up as Tucker (voice)
 2016 Café Society as Sol
 2016 C Street as Super
 2017 There's...Johnny! as Bernie Greenfield
 2018 Green Book as Jules Podell
 2018 Shameless as Congressman Wayne Ubberman
 2019 7 Days to Vegas as Jim 'Angry Jim'
 2022 Dollface as Craig Wiley
 2023 That '90s Show as Bob Pinciotti

References

External links

 
 Don Stark as Oscar Kindcade on VH1's Hit the Floor
 

Living people
20th-century American male actors
21st-century American male actors
American male film actors
American male television actors
American people of German-Jewish descent
American people of Italian descent
California State University, Northridge alumni
Jewish American male actors
Male actors from Los Angeles
Male actors from New York City
21st-century American Jews
1954 births